Tamir Tuller is an Israeli engineer, a computer scientist, and a systems and synthetic biologist. He is a professor and the director of Tel Aviv University's Laboratory of Computational Systems and Synthetic Biology. As of February 2022, Tuller has authored over 150 peer-reviewed scientific journal articles and hundreds of additional types of publications and patents. In addition, he is the founder and  primary instructor of the International Genetically Engineered Machine program at Tel Aviv University and an entrepreneur.

Education

Tuller earned his bachelor's degree via the Atuda in 1996.  He finished four degrees (most of them from Tel Aviv University): BSc in electrical engineering, mechanical engineering (aerodynamics), computer science, and economics and management.
His graduate studies include an MSc in electrical engineering (from the Technion-Israel Institute of Technology in Haifa, Israel), MSc studies in computer science at Tel Aviv University, and two PhDs from Tel Aviv University, one in computer science and one in medical science.

He was a Safra postdoctoral fellow at Tel Aviv University's School of Computer Science and Department of Molecular Microbiology and Biotechnology, and a Koshland postdoctoral fellow at the Weizmann Institute of Science's Faculty of Mathematics and Computer Science, Department of Molecular Genetics.

He joined Tel Aviv University's Department of Biomedical Engineering in 2011 and on 2018 he became a full professor.

Research and career
Tuller does interdisciplinary research on gene expression based on various tools from disciplines such as computer science, engineering, molecular evolution, biophysics, and statistics. He is particularly interested in developing novel ways for modelling and engineering gene expression, as  developing approaches for better understand how gene expression is encoded in the genetic material. His gene expression models are then used for solving various objective in biotechnology and pharma such as vaccine development, human diseases modeling, food tech, and antibody engineering.

Tuller is presently a Full Professor at the Tel-Aviv University in the department of Biomedical Engineering and Edmond J. Safra centre for bioinformatics. Prior to obtaining his current position, he also was an engineer at DSP group in VLSI chip design. He served as the co-founder and chief scientific officer of Synvaccine Ltd, and Imagindairy Ltd and as a consultant to various additional biotech companies.

Awards and honors
Tuller received the Juludan Research Prize from the Technion, Israel institute of technology in 2016.

Additional awards include the Minerva Arches award, The Center for Complexity Science (Yeshaya Horowitz) fellowship, Weizmann Institute of Science Koshland fellowship for exceptionally outstanding postdoctoral fellows, The Asi Shnidman foundation for excellent young researchers in the Chaim Sheba medical center at Tel-Hashomer.

Publications
As of February 2022, Tuller has authored over 150 peer-reviewed scientific journal articles  and hundreds of additional types of publications and patents.
 Accelerating Whole-Cell Simulations of mRNA Translation Using a Dedicated Hardware.
 Estimating the predictive power of silent mutations on cancer classification and prognosis.
 Algorithms for ribosome traffic engineering and their potential in improving host cells' titer and growth rate.
 High-resolution modeling of the selection on local mRNA folding strength in coding sequences across the tree of life.
 Solving the riddle of  the evolution of Shine-Dalgarno based translation in chloroplasts.
 Novel Insights into Gene Expression Regulation during Meiosis Revealed by Translation Elongation Dynamics.
 ChimeraUGEM: unsupervised gene expression modeling in any given organism.

References

External links

Synthetic biologists
Israeli engineers
Israeli computer scientists
Israeli biologists
Israeli company founders
Living people
Year of birth missing (living people)
Technion – Israel Institute of Technology alumni
Tel Aviv University alumni
Academic staff of Tel Aviv University